Mer Island is an island locality in the Torres Strait Island Region, Queensland, Australia. The locality consists of a single island, Murray Island. The town of Murray Island is on the island's northwest coast.

Education 

Notable people 

 Eddie Mabo, Indigenous Australian campaigner for Indigenous land rights

References 

Torres Strait Island Region
Localities in Queensland